Zhutovo 1-ye is a rural locality (a khutor) and the administrative center of Kovalyovskoye Rural Settlement, Oktyabrsky District, Volgograd Oblast, Russia. The population was 566 as of 2010. There are 7 streets.

Geography 
Zhutovo 1-ye is located in steppe, on Yergeni, on the right bank of the Aksay River, 17 km east of Oktyabrsky (the district's administrative centre) by road. Kovalevka is the nearest rural locality.

References 

Rural localities in Oktyabrsky District, Volgograd Oblast